North Westmorland can refer to:

The Barony of Westmorland, which was the northern part of the English traditional county of Westmorland.
The North Westmorland Rural District, which was an administrative district in Westmorland in the late 20th century.